The 10th Annual Streamy Awards was the tenth installment of the Streamy Awards honoring the best in American streaming television series and their creators. The ceremony was held on December 12, 2020, hosted by drag queens Trixie Mattel and Katya Zamolodchikova and streamed exclusively to YouTube. To adhere to social distancing restrictions due to the COVID-19 pandemic, the duo presented the awards from a party bus travelling around Los Angeles. The Streamys introduced the Creator Honor awards for the 10th Streamy Awards, presented by past Streamy Award winners to new or breakout creators that resonated with them in 2020. The show also featured "spotlight segments" in which content creators highlighted important social and cultural issues such as racial justice, COVID adaptability, and mental health.

Performers
The 10th Streamy Awards featured the musical performances of the following artists:

Winners and nominees 

The nominees were announced on October 21, 2020. Winners were announced during the digital ceremony on December 12, hosted by Trixie Mattel and Katya Zamolodchikova from a party bus in Los Angeles.

Winners are listed first, in bold.

Creator Honor awards

 Bailey Sarian (presented by NikkieTutorials)
 Brent Rivera (presented by Juanpa Zurita)
 CalebCity (presented by Kyle Exum)
 Elsa Majimbo (presented by Lilly Singh)
 Laviedunprince (presented by PatrickStarrr)
 Taylor Cassidy (presented by Liza Koshy)
 Kurzgesagt (presented by Marques Brownlee)

Brand Awards

Purpose Awards

Reception 
Alexandra Del Rosario, writing for Deadline Hollywood, described Doja Cat's performance of "Say So" and a segment dedicated to the Black Lives Matter movement as highlights of the night. According to Kelly Kozakevich of MediaVillage, the show had "a plethora of stand out moments" including spotlight segments by activist Amber Whittington on racial justice and Jay Shetty on depression, anxiety and mental health, and the Creator Honor awards which she called "a heartfelt addition to the show". She also praised the musical performances and "Streamy 10 Flashback" segments which showcased memorable moments from previous Streamy Awards ceremonies.

References 

Streamy Awards
Streamy Awards
Streamy Awards
2020 in Internet culture